Peter John Stewart (born 8 August 1947) is a British male former middle-distance runner. His greatest achievement was a gold medal in the 3000 metres at the European Athletics Indoor Championships in 1971. He also competed in the 1500 metres at the 1971 European Athletics Championships that year, but failed to make the final. He also competed for Scotland at the 1970 British Commonwealth Games, narrowly missing out on a medal in fourth place.

Nationally, he won the 1500 m at the 1972 AAA Championships and the 3000 m at the 1971 AAA Indoor Championships. He was also Scottish champion in the 1500 m in 1970.

Both he and his brother, Ian Stewart, were members of Birchfield Harriers. At the Emsley Carr Mile, he took back-to-back titles in 1971 and 1972, following on from his brother's victory the previous year.

International competitions

National titles
AAA Championships
1500 m: 1972
AAA Indoor Championships
3000 m: 1971

See also
List of European Athletics Indoor Championships medalists (men)

References

External links

Living people
1947 births
Scottish male middle-distance runners
Athletes (track and field) at the 1970 British Commonwealth Games
Commonwealth Games competitors for Scotland